Myrmica faniensis is a species of ant in family Formicidae. It is endemic to Belgium. However, it should be considered a junior synonym of Myrmica karavajevi (Arnoldi, 1930).

References

Myrmica
Insects described in 1970
Endemic fauna of Belgium
Taxonomy articles created by Polbot